The James Bute Company Warehouse, located at 711 William Street in Houston, Texas, was listed on the National Register of Historic Places on July 7, 1994. The Bute Paint Company, founded by James Bute, operated from 1867 until 1990.  Its warehouse building on William Street was built in 1909.  Abandoned after 1990, the property was converted to loft apartments in 1993.

See also
 National Register of Historic Places listings in Harris County, Texas

References

Commercial buildings on the National Register of Historic Places in Texas
National Register of Historic Places in Houston
Warehouses on the National Register of Historic Places